The 1977 Oakland Athletics season was a season in American baseball. The team finished 7th in the American League West with a record of 63 wins and 98 losses. Paid attendance for the season was 495,578, one of the worst attendance figures for the franchise during the 1970s.

Offseason 
 November 5, 1976: Manager Chuck Tanner was traded by the Oakland Athletics to the Pittsburgh Pirates for Manny Sanguillén.
 November 9, 1976: Billy Williams was released by the Athletics.
 January 9, 1977: Craig Minetto was signed by the Athletics as a free agent.
 February 25, 1977: Ken McMullen was purchased from the Athletics by the Milwaukee Brewers.
 March 15, 1977: Phil Garner, Tommy Helms, and Chris Batton were traded by the Athletics to the Pittsburgh Pirates for Rick Langford, Tony Armas, Doug Bair, Dave Giusti, Doc Medich, and Mitchell Page.
 March 15, 1977: Jim Todd was traded by the Athletics to the Chicago Cubs for Joe Coleman.
 March 15, 1977: Jerry Tabb was purchased by the Athletics from the Chicago Cubs.
 March 15, 1977: Gaylen Pitts was traded by the Athletics to the Chicago Cubs for Jim Tyrone.
 March 16, 1977: Dick Allen was signed as a free agent by the Athletics.

Regular season 
After the 1976 season, most of the Athletics' veteran players who had become eligible for free agency left. In 1977, only three years after winning the World Series, the A's finished with the worst record in the American League West, behind even the expansion Seattle Mariners (though by only 1/2 game, as one game with the Minnesota Twins was canceled by weather and never made up).

On June 10, Jack McKeon was fired as manager and replaced by former Arizona State University coach Bobby Winkles.

After the season, owner Charlie Finley attempted to trade Vida Blue to the Cincinnati Reds for a player of lesser stature and cash, but Commissioner Bowie Kuhn vetoed the deal. The commissioner claimed that it was tantamount to the sale of the star pitcher to the New York Yankees that the commissioner voided in 1976. The commissioner claimed that adding Blue to the Reds' already formidable pitching staff would make a mockery of the National League West race. Instead, Blue was traded across the bay to the San Francisco Giants in a multi-player trade that received the Commissioner's blessing.

Proposed sale 
Kuhn and other owners thought that the Athletics relocating would alleviate baseball's problems in the Bay Area regarding poor attendance. Kuhn attempted to get an ownership group to purchase the Athletics and relocate to Washington, D.C., with the intention of moving them to the National League.

Season standings

Record vs. opponents

Opening Day lineup 
Billy North, CF
Rodney Scott, 2B
Mitchell Page. LF
Dick Allen, 1B
Manny Sanguillén, C
Wayne Gross, 3B
Earl Williams, DH
Tony Armas, RF
Rob Picciolo, SS
Mike Torrez, P

Notable transactions 
 April 4, 1977: Sheldon Mallory was purchased by the Athletics from the New York Mets.
 April 27, 1977: Mike Torrez was traded by the Athletics to the New York Yankees for Dock Ellis, Larry Murray and Marty Perez.
 June 7, 1977: Shooty Babitt was drafted by the Athletics in the 25th round of the 1977 Major League Baseball Draft.
 June 15, 1977: Dock Ellis was purchased from the Athletics by the Texas Rangers.
 June 15, 1977: Denny Walling was traded by the Athletics to the Houston Astros for Willie Crawford.

Roster

Player stats

Batting

Starters by position 
Note: Pos = Position; G = Games played; AB = At bats; H = Hits; Avg. = Batting average; HR = Home runs; RBI = Runs batted in

Other batters 
Note: G = Games played; AB = At bats; H = Hits; Avg. = Batting average; HR = Home runs; RBI = Runs batted in

Pitching

Starting pitchers 
Note: G = Games pitched; IP = Innings pitched; W = Wins; L = Losses; ERA = Earned run average; SO = Strikeouts

Other pitchers 
Note: G = Games pitched; IP = Innings pitched; W = Wins; L = Losses; ERA = Earned run average; SO = Strikeouts

Relief pitchers 
Note: G = Games pitched; W = Wins; L = Losses; SV = Saves; ERA = Earned run average; SO = Strikeouts

Awards and honors

All-Stars 

 Vida Blue, reserve
 Wayne Gross, reserve

Farm system

References

External  links
1977 Oakland Athletics team page at Baseball Reference
1977 Oakland Athletics team page at www.baseball-almanac.com

Oakland Athletics seasons
Oakland Athletics season
Oakland Athletics season